News 12 may refer to:
KSLA-TV Shreveport, Louisiana
News 12 Networks, 24-hour local cable news television network in Connecticut, New Jersey, and New York
WRDW-TV Augusta, Georgia